Go Woo-suk (born August 6, 1998) is a South Korean professional baseball pitcher currently playing for the LG Twins of the KBO League. He competed in the 2020 Summer Olympics.

References

External links
 Career statistics and player information from Korea Baseball Organization

 Go Woo-suk at LG Twins Baseball Club

LG Twins players
KBO League pitchers
South Korean baseball players
Olympic baseball players of South Korea
Baseball players at the 2020 Summer Olympics
People from Incheon
1998 births
Living people